The Eastern Mindanao frog or Tagibo wart frog (Limnonectes diuatus) is a species of frog in the family  Dicroglossidae. It is endemic to the Philippines, where it occurs in the mountains of Mindanao.

This frog lives in streams and rivers in rainforest habitat. It is common, but it is considered to be vulnerable due to habitat loss and degradation. Agricultural operations lead to deforestation in the area and the waterways are polluted.

References

Limnonectes
Amphibians of the Philippines
Endemic fauna of the Philippines
Fauna of Mindanao
Taxonomy articles created by Polbot
Amphibians described in 1977